Warin Chamrap is a district (amphoe) in the western part of Ubon Ratchathani province, northeastern Thailand (Isan).

Geography
Neighboring districts are (from the north clockwise) Mueang Ubon Ratchathani, Sawang Wirawong, Na Yia, Det Udom, Samrong of Ubon Ratchathani Province, and Kanthararom of Sisaket province.

The important water resource is the Mun River. Warin Chamrap is located just 2 kilometers (1 mi) from Mueang Ubon Ratchathani, with Mun River between them.

History
In 1913 the district was renamed from Thaksin Ubon (ทักษิณอุบล) to Warin Chamrap.

 Since 1938, Warin Chamrap has been the eastern terminus of the northeastern railway line from Bangkok's central Hua Lamphong Railway Station via the Nakhon Ratchasima Railway Station.

Education

Ubon Ratchathani University is in Warin Chamrap District.

Administration
The district is divided into 16 sub-districts (tambons), which are further subdivided into 185 villages (mubans). The town (thesaban mueang) Warin Chamrap covers the tambon Warin Chamrap. There are two more townships (thesaban tambon): Saen Suk covers tambon Saen Suk, and Huai Kha Yung covers parts of tambon Huai Kha Yung. There are a further 15 tambon administrative organizations (TAO).

Missing numbers are tambon which now form the districts Samrong and Sawang Wirawong.

References

External links
amphoe.com

Warin Chamrap